The 2016 season is Start's 4th season in the Tippeligaen since their promotion back to the league in 2012, and their first season with Steinar Pedersen as manager. Start will competed in the Tippeligaen and the Norwegian Cup.

Squad

Transfers

Winter

In:

Out:

Summer

In:

Out:

Competitions

Tippeligaen

Results summary

Results by round

Results

Table

Norwegian Cup

Squad statistics

Appearances and goals

|-
|colspan="14"|Players away from the club on loan:
|-
|colspan="14"|Players who played for Start that left during the season:

|}

Goal scorers

Disciplinary record

References

External links 

Menigheden – official fan club

Norwegian football clubs 2016 season
2016